Leptopsyllidae is a family of fleas in the order Siphonaptera. There are at least 30 genera and 250 described species in Leptopsyllidae.

Genera

References

Further reading

 
 
 
 
 

insect families
Fleas